A blue beret is a blue-colored beret used by various (usually special) military and other organizations, notably the United Nations peacekeepers who are sometimes referred to as the Blue Berets.

Military forces

 Australian Army Aviation, Royal Australian Air Force Airfield Defence Guards
 Belarusian Ground Forces
 Brazilian army cadets (Dark Blue) and Brazilian Army Aviation Command (Royal Blue)
 Royal Canadian Air Force as well as Canadian Army units including Artillery, Electrical and Mechanical Engineers and Signals (dark blue known as "army blue")
 Finnish Navy (dark blue)
 Greek Presidential Guard (light blue)
 Hellenic Army (dark blue), except for Armour, Special Forces, Army Aviation, and Airmobile troops
 German Air Force Regiment, Naval Force Protection Battalion, Kommando Spezialkräfte Marine, German personnel of the Eurocorps and the I. German/Dutch Corps, various others (navy blue)
 German Army medical personnel (cobalt blue)
 Kazakhstani Airmobile Troops
 Royal Malaysian Navy
 Moldovan Ground Forces
 Royal New Zealand Military Police
 Royal New Zealand Air Force Police
 Royal Air Force Police
 Pakistan Army Corps Of Engineers 
 Polícia Aérea, the Portuguese Air Force security forces
 Portuguese Navy
 Royal Malaysian Air Force PASKAU
 Spanish Royal Guard
 Soviet and Russian Airborne Troops (VDV)
 Turkish Armed Forces personnel who completed the Commando course and are assigned to Commando brigades  and Gendarmerie General Command
 United Kingdom Army Air Corps, Royal Air Force
 United Nations Peacekeeping troops
 United States Air Force Security Forces

Police forces
 Special Purpose Police Unit (Azerbaijan), Internal Troops of Azerbaijan
 Royal Malaysia Police
 Royal Malaysia Police General Operations Force
 Royal Malaysia Police Marine Operations Force
 Gendarmery (Serbia), Special Police Units (Serbia), Ministry of Internal Affairs (Serbia)
 Bodyguard Corps of the Public Security Police of Portugal

Other organizations

References

Berets